The 1990 Brisbane Broncos season was the third in the club's history. They competed in the NSWRL's 1990 Winfield Cup premiership and again improved on their previous year, finishing the regular season in second position before going on to come within one match of the grand final, but losing to eventual premiers, the Canberra Raiders.

Broncos players Chris Johns and Kevin Walters were selected to make their international débuts for the Australia national rugby league team in 1990.

Season summary 
The Broncos had some new faces for 1990 season, including Kevin Walters who was lured home from Canberra. In order to increase the Broncos' success in the Winfield Cup, Wayne Bennett controversially sacked Wally Lewis as club captain and gave the role to centre Gene Miles. Miles had retired from representative football, and Bennett hoped he could remove the team's reliance on Lewis.

The Balmian Tigers were the last team unbeaten by the Broncos until their victory in Round 18 of the 1990 season. Brisbane finished the regular season in second position, qualifying for their first finals campaign. In the Preliminary Final against the Canberra Raiders the Broncos were knocked out 30-2 so finished the 1990 season in third place. Canberra then went on to win the competition. At the end of the season, Wally Lewis parted company with the Broncos, moving to the Gold Coast Seagulls.

Match results 

 Game following a State of Origin match

Ladder

Scorers

Honours 
 Nil

League 
 Player of the year: Kevin Walters
 Rookie of the year: Paul Hauff / Willie Carne
 Best back: Kevin Walters
 Best forward: Gene Miles
 Clubman of the year: Ray Herring

References 

Brisbane Broncos seasons
Brisbane Broncos season
Brisbane Broncos season